The Ambassador of Germany to Australia is an officer of the German Foreign Office and the head of the Embassy of the Federal Republic of Germany to the Commonwealth of Australia. The position has the rank and status of an Ambassador Extraordinary and Plenipotentiary and holds non-resident accreditation for Nauru, Papua New Guinea, the Solomon Islands and Vanuatu. The ambassador is based with the embassy in Yarralumla in Canberra but initially from 1952 to 1958 was based in Sydney.

The ambassador is currently Markus Ederer since September 2022, who was most recently Ambassador of the European Union to Russia. Germany and Australia have enjoyed diplomatic relations since 1952, although official consular representation existed in Sydney and Melbourne since 1879 and an embassy for the German Democratic Republic, with its own ambassador, also existed between 1972 and 1990. The Consulate in Sydney was also re-established in 1952 with Reinhold Renauld von Ungern-Sternberg appointed until 1956.

Office holders

Consuls-general of the German Empire for Australia, 1879–1914
Based in Sydney, with responsibility for "Australia, Tasmania, New Zealand and the Fiji-Islands".

Consuls-general of Germany for Australia, 1923–1939
Based in Melbourne from 1923 to 1928, then moved to Sydney. Diplomatic relations were severed on 5 September 1939 and Switzerland acted as repository for German interests thereafter.

Ambassadors of the Federal Republic of Germany

Ambassadors of the German Democratic Republic, 1972–1990

See also
Germany–Australia relations
Foreign relations of Germany

References
Tobias C. Bringmann: Handbuch der Diplomatie, 1815–1963: Auswärtige Missionschefs in Deutschland und Deutsche Missionschefs im Ausland von Metternich bis Adenauer, de Gruyter, 2001, p. 91.

External links

Missions of the Federal Republic of Germany in Australia

 
Ambassadors of East Germany
Germany
Australia
Germany